Mary Al-Atrash (born 27 June 1994) is a Palestinian swimmer. She competed in the women's 50 metre freestyle event at the 2016 Summer Olympics, where she ranked 62nd with a time of 28.76 seconds. She did not advance to the semifinals. She was the Palestinian flag bearer in the closing ceremony.

References

1994 births
Living people
Palestinian female swimmers
Olympic swimmers of Palestine
Swimmers at the 2016 Summer Olympics
People from Bethlehem
Swimmers at the 2010 Asian Games
Asian Games competitors for Palestine